Willow is a given name used in reference to the willow. It has grown in popularity in English speaking countries along with other names inspired by the natural world.  It first entered the top 1,000 names given to American newborn girls in 2000 and was ranked in 39th position for American baby girls in 2021. It was among the top 10 most popular names for girls born in Wales in 2020. It was also among the top 10 names for girls born in New Zealand in 2020.

Notable people with the name include:

 Willow Bay (born 1963), American model and journalist
 Willow Dawson (fl. 1990s–2010s), Canadian cartoonist and illustrator
 Willow Geer (born 1981), American actress
 Willow Hand (born 1998), American fashion model
 Willow Johnson, Canadian voice actress
 Willow Koerber (born 1977), American professional cross-country mountain biker
 Willow Macky (1921–2006), New Zealand songwriter
 Willow Palin, daughter of American vice-presidential nominee Sarah Palin
 Willow Pill (born 1995), American drag performer
 Willow Sage Hart (born 2011) American singer
 Willow Shields (born 2000), American actress
 Willow Smith (born 2000), American singer, actress, and dancer

Other uses of the name include:

 Willow Rosenberg, fictional character in the fantasy television series Buffy the Vampire Slayer (1997–2003)
 Willow Harris, fictional character from the Australian television soap opera Home and Away (2017–2021)
 Willow, a western crowned pigeon in Angry Birds Stella and The Angry Birds Movie
 Willow Ufgood, title character from the 1988 movie Willow starring Warwick Davis and Val Kilmer and the 2022 Disney Plus TV series with Christian Slater & Erin Kellyman & Kevin Pollack
 Willow Schnee, a character in the animated web series RWBY

References

English feminine given names
Given names derived from plants or flowers